Joseph McAninly (15 January 1913 – 1989) was an English footballer who made 74 appearances in the Football League playing as an inside right for Chesterfield and Darlington in the 1930s. He was on the books of Huddersfield Town and Clapton Orient without representing either club in the League.

References

1913 births
1989 deaths
People from Tow Law
Footballers from County Durham
English footballers
Association football inside forwards
Huddersfield Town A.F.C. players
Leyton Orient F.C. players
Eden Colliery Welfare F.C. players
Chesterfield F.C. players
Darlington F.C. players
English Football League players
Place of death missing